Xol Qarabucaq (also, Xolqarabucaq and Kholkarabudzhak) is a village and municipality in the Neftchala Rayon of Azerbaijan.  It has a population of 3,789.  The municipality consists of the villages of Xol Qarabucaq, Xoltəzəkənd, and Dördlər.

References 

Populated places in Neftchala District